Hendrik Freerk Tillema (5 July 1870 in Echten26 November 1952 in Bloemendaal) was a colonial Dutch official, writer, and hygienist in the Dutch East Indies (now Indonesia).

Life
Tillema was born in 1870. Living in Semarang on Java in the Dutch East Indies, he was a pharmacist and social reformer. His program of "village improvement" aimed to improve living conditions and health among the native Javanese as a necessary condition for the prolongation of Dutch rule over the colony. He worked with city doctor Willem Thomas de Vogel to try to develop healthier land in the nearby hills, relieving overcrowding and improving health among Semarang's poor, but was unable to sway the rest of the city council. The land he and de Vogel purchased was eventually used for Thomas Karsten's upscale residential district New Candi, now Candisari. He died in 1952.

Works

 . (Dutch)
 . (Dutch)
 . (Dutch)

References

Citations

Bibliography
 .
 .

1870 births
1952 deaths
Dutch businesspeople
Dutch writers
Dutch pharmacists
People from De Fryske Marren
People from Semarang